The Brixia Model 35 was an Italian small-sized, rapid firing light mortar of World War II.

Description 

The Brixia light mortar is a 45 mm calibre light mortar mounted on a legged base and designed for operation by two crew. The rear legs are fitted with a pad for the gunner to lay forward on behind the mortar, or sit upon when the situation allowed.  A lever allowed for operating the breech and firing the weapon, while ammunition was fed in by the loader.  Well trained teams could reach up to 18 rounds per minute, although operational rate of fire was less intense to avoid damage to the firing tube. The Brixia mortar differed from comparable World War II weapons in that it was trigger fired with the help of separate ignition cartridges to be fed into a special magazine, making the weapon more similar to modern cannon-mortars than conventional parabolic grenade launchers of the time.

At tactical level, an infantry battalion had two platoons each of 9 Brixia mortars assigned. Each Brixia mortar platoon was divided in three squads with three mortars each, which were distributed to the companies. The heavier 81mm mortar was assigned to the heavy weapons company of the regiment.

The Brixia was a complicated weapon but could lay down very precise and intense curtains of fire. This was offset by the shells, which fragmented poorly and, due to the limited calibre, had a very light and low-yield warhead. The weapon served on every front where Italian troops were involved (North Africa, Balkans, East Africa, Southern Russia, France) and was also employed during defence of the homeland against invading allied troops and during clashes between RSI formations and Italian partisans, on both sides, due to many Italian partisans having a former military background it was one of the few support weapons which could be found in the hands of the local Resistance.  Mortars used by the German units fighting alongside the Italians were given the designation 4.5 cm GrW 176(i).

Users 
 
 : captured from the Italians
 
 
  Yugoslav Partisans

See also 
 Tromboncino M28 grenade launcher, a combined carbine and rifle grenade launcher, used unsuccessfully prior to the Model 35
 List of artillery

References

External links 

 U.S. Intelligence Report on Italian 45 mm Mortar

World War II mortars of Italy
World War II infantry weapons of Italy
Infantry mortars
45 mm artillery
Weapons and ammunition introduced in 1935